Go Nuts Donuts is a doughnut-shop chain based in the Philippines.

History
Go Nuts Donuts was founded by the De Ocampo and Trillana families in 2003. As of 2009, the chain sells an average of 20,000 doughnuts per day. At one time it sold as many as 27,000. Wanting to promote their doughnuts outside the country, they started delivering through DHL or FedEx.

In 2012, 40% of Go Nuts Donuts was bought by IP Ventures Retail Group. N

In the year 2018, Go Nuts Donuts rebranded and is now called as GoNuts.

See also
 List of doughnut shops
 Go Nuts Donuts Game - In Go Nuts for Donuts, players lay out donuts from the deck equal to the amount of players plus one

References

Doughnut shops
Restaurants established in 2003
Fast-food chains of the Philippines
Companies based in Manila